Chris Craddock is a Canadian actor, playwright and filmmaker.  From 2004 to 2008, he served as the artistic director of the Rapid Fire Theatre.  He is also a co-creator and cast member of the television series Tiny Plastic Men, for which he was nominated for a Rosie Award for Best Performance by an Alberta Actor.  He also wrote and directed the film It's Not My Fault and I Don't Care Anyway (2017), which is based on his play Public Speaking.

At the 19th GLAAD Media Awards, Craddock, along with Nathan Cuckow and Aaron Marci, won the GLAAD Media Award for Outstanding New York Theater: Off-Off Broadway for their play BASH'd: A Gay Rap Opera.

Craddock is from Kitchener, Ontario.  In 1996, he graduated from the University of Alberta with a Bachelor of Fine Arts in acting.  He resides in Edmonton as of October 2017.

Select plays
BASH'd: A Gay Rap Opera (co-written with Nathan Cuckow; music by Aaron Marci)
Public Speaking
Irma Voth

References

External links
 
 

Living people
Male actors from Kitchener, Ontario
University of Alberta alumni
Canadian male film actors
Canadian male dramatists and playwrights
Canadian male stage actors
Canadian male television actors
Canadian male voice actors
Writers from Kitchener, Ontario
21st-century Canadian dramatists and playwrights
20th-century Canadian male actors
21st-century Canadian male actors
20th-century Canadian male writers
21st-century Canadian male writers
Year of birth missing (living people)
Canadian artistic directors